This list of compositions by Thomas Arne is sorted by genre.

Art songs
Arne composed numerous art songs throughout his career, most of which were written for the stage. Many of his songs were published in anthologies throughout his lifetime, but the exact number of songs he composed is now unknown. The following is a list of publications which included songs by Arne during his lifetime. The number of songs by Arne is in square brackets.

Catches, canons, glees
The exact number of catches, canons, and glees composed by Arne is now unknown. He began writing such works for the pleasure gardens in the 1740s but the majority of his output in this area dates from the 1760s and 1770s. Many of his glees were published in anthologies which, aside for 11 glees written for the Noblemen and Gentlemen's Catch Club, are the only surviving compositions of his in this area. This is a list of the published anthologies containing catches, canons, and glees by Arne. The number of songs by Arne is in square brackets.

Instrumental music
Arne showed little interest in writing concert music. The instrumental music he did compose derives mostly from his stage works. This list contains his instrumental works that have been published separately from his stage works. Not listed below are a few solo violin and solo double bass pieces whose composition date is now unknown and whose publication did not occur until 1978.

Odes and cantatas
 A Grand Epithalamium, 1736, lost
 Black-Ey’d Susan (cant., R. Leveridge), 1740, lost
 God bless our noble king, A, T, B, ATB, 2 hn, 2 ob, str, bc, 1745, GB-Lbl, ed. C. Bartlett (Wyton, 1985)
 Fair Celia love pretended (cant., W. Congreve), 1v, vns, bc, Vocal Melody, i (1749)
 Chaucer’s Recantation (cant.), 1v, str, bc, Vocal Melody, ii (1750)
 Ode to Chearfulness, 1750, lost
 Cymon and Iphigenia (cant., J. Dryden), 1v, str, bc, vs (1750), pts Bu
 Six Cantatas, fs (1755): Bacchus and Ariadne, 1v, 2 fl, 2 ob, 2 hn, str, bc; Delia, 1v, str, bc; Frolick and Free (G. Granville), 1v, 2 ob, str, bc; Lydia (after Sappho), 1v, 2 bn, str, bc; The Morning, 1v, fl/rec, str, bc; The School of Anacreon, 1v, 2 hn, str, bc; Lydia and The Morning, both ed. R. Hufstader (New York, 1971)
 5 odes in Del Canzionere d’Orazio (1757): Delle muse all’almo core, 1v, str, bc; Finche fedele il core, 2vv, 2 fl, str, bc; Finche fedele il core, 2vv, 2 vn, bc; Se vanti in Telefo, 1v, 2 hn, str, bc; Tu mi fuggi schizzinosa, 1v, 2 vn, bc [= Advice to Chloe]
 The Spring (cant.), 1v, str, bc, British Melody (1760)
 Love and Resentment (cant.), 1v, 2 cl, 2 vn, bc, Summer Amusement (1766)
 The Lover’s Recantation (cant.), 1v, 2 fl, 2 ob, str, bc; vs in The Winter’s Amusement (1761), fs, Lbl, ed. P. Young (Leipzig, 1988)
 Advice to Chloe (cant.), 1v, vns, bc, New Favourite Songs (1768)
 An Ode upon Dedicating a Building to Shakespeare (D. Garrick), 1769, speaker, S, S, S, S, T, Bar, SATB, orch; 9 nos. in vs (1769)
 Love and Resolution (musical dialogue), 1770, music lost
 Reffley Spring (cant.), 2vv, 2 vn, bc, vs (1772)
 Diana (cant.), 1v, 2 fl, 2 ob, 2 cl, 2 hn, 2 vn, bc; vs in The Vocal Grove (1774)
 Whittington’s Feast (secular orat, Arne, after Dryden: Alexander’s Feast), 1776, S, S, T, B, SATB, 2 fl, 2 ob, 2bn, 2 tpt, 2 hn, timps, drum, str, bc, fs, US-Wc
 A wretch long tortured with disdain (cant.), 1v, 2 fl, 2 ob, 2 hn, str, bc, full score GB-Lbl

Sacred music
Compared to his most important English contemporaries, William Boyce and John Stanley, Arne's output of sacred music was small; the major reason was his Roman Catholic faith, which was at odds with the Church of England during his lifetime.

Stage works

Works misattributed to Arne
 The Most Celebrated Aires in the Opera of Tom Thumb (London, 1733), by John Frederick Lampe
 Ode upon St. Cecilia’s Day, now lost, by Charles Burney
 Caractacus (c1795), possibly by Charles Wesley junior
 Epithalamium, At Cana’s Feast, attribution doubtful
 Mass in D by Alphonse d'Eve
 The hymn tune "Helmsley", based on an anonymous Dublin air.

Sources
 Peter Holman, Todd Gilman: "Thomas Augustine Arne", Grove Music Online ed. L. Macy. (subscription access)

Arne